The Crime and the Silence: Confronting the Massacre of Jews in Wartime Jedwabne is a 2004 book by Polish journalist Anna Bikont on the Jedwabne massacre, a 1941 pogrom of Polish Jews in Jedwabne, German-occupied Poland. It was translated to French in 2011 and English in 2015. It received the European Book Prize in 2011.

Content 

The book was first published in Polish as My z Jedwabnego (2004, "Jedwabne: Battlefield of Memory"). It was next published in French under the title Le Crime et le Silence: Jedwabne 1941, la mémoire d'un pogrom dans la Pologne d'aujourd'hui (2011) and won the European Book Prize. The English translation by Alissa Valles was published in 2015.

In writing her book Bikont was inspired by Jan. T. Gross' pioneering study on the subject (Neighbors: The Destruction of the Jewish Community in Jedwabne, Poland, 2001). One of the novel areas she explores is the reaction of Jedwabne villagers to Gross' revelations, what one of the reviewers called "the early stage of the Jedwabne debate". One of the themes of her book is the lingering antisemitism present in modern-day Jedwabne, where a number of inhabitants were unwilling to take part in her research project and yet others were afraid to be seen speaking to her. Readings of her book in Poland have been picketed by Polish nationalists.

The book is structured with interposing chapters of Bikont's diary (written in the years 2000-2003) and journalistic reportage. Pursuing some leads and interviews, Bikont traveled among others to United States, Israel, Costa Rica and Argentina.

Reception 
Louis Begley in his review for The New York Times wrote that the book is "beautifully written, devastating and very important". A reviewer for The Guardian likewise called the book a "a powerful and important study of the poisonous effects of racism and hatred within a community". Sinclair McKay reviewing the book for The Telegraph noted that the book "is a hauntingly human study of the nightmare of persecution", though criticized it for insufficient historical background and lacking a map that many readers would find useful.

Joanna Michlic reviewed the Polish edition, praising it as "a first-class journalistic account" recommended for students, scholars of the 20th century genocides as well as to those interested in the Polish-Jewish history, noting that the book's main contribution is to be found in the "investigation of contemporary memory of these crimes" among the survivors, perpetrators, rescuers and their descendants. She calls the book "an anthropological and a psychological study of a deeply troubling memory of the darkest crimes in the history of Polish-Jewish relations" and notes that while the author is a journalist, it is an exemplary journalistic study that is valuable to scholars pursuing historical studies in this topic area.

Yves Gounin reviewed the French edition for Médiations. He compared the book to The Lost: A Search for Six of Six Million by Daniel Mendelsohn, noting that Bikont's account in French unfortunately suffers from translation problems.

Reviewing the book for the Jewish Quarterly, Jennifer Weisberg calls the book a "masterpiece", praising Bikont for her efforts to gather numerous testimonies from surviving witnesses.

References

External links 
 
 
 
  Ketola, Mikko. "The crime and the silence:[kirja-arvostelu]." Suomen kirkkohistoriallisen seuran vuosikirja 106 (2016) (2016).

Books about the Holocaust
2004 non-fiction books
Books about Jewish Polish history
Polish non-fiction books